Nepenthes masoalensis  is one of two tropical pitcher plant species from Madagascar, the other being N. madagascariensis.

Nepenthes masoalensis is known only from eastern Madagascar; it occurs in the Masoala Peninsula and the Mount Ambato region. It has been recorded from Pandanus and Sphagnum swamps, mountain ridgetops, and xerophytic vegetation. Nepenthes masoalensis is a lowland species, growing at 0–400 m altitude.

References

Further reading

 Bauer, U., C.J. Clemente, T. Renner & W. Federle 2012. Form follows function: morphological diversification and alternative trapping strategies in carnivorous Nepenthes pitcher plants. Journal of Evolutionary Biology 25(1): 90–102. 
  Lecoufle, M. 1985. A la découverte du Nepenthes masoalensis (1). Dionée 5.
  Lecoufle, M. 1987. A la découverte du Nepenthes masoalensis (suite). Dionée 11.
 McPherson, S. 2010. An expedition to Madagascar. Planta Carnivora 32(1): 6–13.
 Meimberg, H., A. Wistuba, P. Dittrich & G. Heubl 2001. Molecular phylogeny of Nepenthaceae based on cladistic analysis of plastid trnK intron sequence data. Plant Biology 3(2): 164–175. 
  Meimberg, H. 2002.  Ph.D. thesis, Ludwig Maximilian University of Munich, Munich.
 Meimberg, H. & G. Heubl 2006. Introduction of a nuclear marker for phylogenetic analysis of Nepenthaceae. Plant Biology 8(6): 831–840. 
 Schlosser, E. 2005. Notes on some little known carnivorous plants from Madagascar. Carnivorous Plant Newsletter 34(4): 100–105.
 Schmid-Hollinger, R. 1982. Nepenthaceæ. In: B. Jonsell, M. Keraudren-Aymonin & R. Schmid-Höllinger. Flore de Madagascar et des Comores: Famille 84 — Crucifères / Famille 85 — Moringacées / Famille 86 — Népenthacées / Famille 87 — Droséracées. Muséum National d'Histoire Naturelle, Paris. pp. 41–51. .
  Schmid-Hollinger, R. N.d. Nepenthes masoalensis. bio-schmidhol.ch. 

masoalensis
Carnivorous plants of Africa
Endemic flora of Madagascar
Endangered flora of Africa